The Qilian Mountains (also romanized as Tsilien; Mongghul: Chileb), together with the Altyn-Tagh (Altun Shan) also known as Nan Shan (literally "Southern Mountains"), as it is to the south of Hexi Corridor, is a northern outlier of the Kunlun Mountains, forming the border between Qinghai and the Gansu provinces of northern China.

Geography
The range stretches from the south of Dunhuang some 800 km to the southeast, forming the northeastern escarpment of the Tibetan Plateau and the southwestern border of the Hexi Corridor.

Other major peaks include Gangshiqia Peak in the east.

The Nan-Shan range continues to the west as Yema Shan (5,250 m) and Altun Shan (Altyn Tagh) (5,798 m). To the east, it passes north of Qinghai Lake, terminating as Daban Shan and Xinglong Shan near Lanzhou, with Maoma Shan peak (4,070 m) an eastern outlier. Sections of the Ming Dynasty's Great Wall pass along its northern slopes, and south of northern outlier Longshou Shan (3,616 m).

The Qilian mountains are the source of numerous, mostly small, rivers and creeks that flow northeast, enabling irrigated agriculture in the  Hexi Corridor (Gansu Corridor) communities, and eventually disappearing in the Alashan Desert. The best known of these streams is the Ejin (Heihe) River.  The region has many glaciers, the largest of which is the Touming Mengke.  These glaciers have undergone acceleration in their melting in recent decades.

Lake Hala is a large brackish lake, located within the Qilian mountains. 

The characteristic ecosystem of the Qilian Mountains has been described by the World Wildlife Fund as the Qilian Mountains conifer forests.

Biandukou, with an altitude of over 3500 m, is a pass in the Qilian Mountains. It links Minle County of Gansu in the north and Qilian County of Qinghai in the south.

History

The Shiji mentions the name "Qilian mountains" together with Dunhuang in relation to the homeland of the Yuezhi. These Qilian Mountains however, has been suggested to be the mountains now known as Tian Shan, 1,500 km to the west. Dunhuang has also been argued to be the Dunhong mountain. Qilian is said to be a Xiongnu word meaning "sky" according to Yan Shigu, a Tang Dynasty commentator on the Hanshu. Sanping Chen (1998) suggested that 天 tiān, 昊天 hàotiān, 祁連 qílián, and 赫連 Hèlián were all cognates and descended from multisyllabic Proto-Sinitic *gh?klien. Schessler (2014) objects to Yan Shigu's statement that 祁連 was a Xiongnu word; he reconstructs 祁連's pronunciation in around 121 BCE as *gɨ-lian, apparently the same etymon as 乾 (☰) the Trigram for "Heaven", in standard Chinese qián < Middle Chinese QYS *gjän < Eastern Han Chinese gɨan < Old Chinese *gran, which Schuessler etymologizes as from Proto-Sino-Tibetan and related to Proto-Tibeto-Burman *m-ka-n, cognate with Written Tibetan མཁའ (Wylie transliteration: mkha') “heaven”.

The Tuyuhun were based around the Qilian mountains.

The mountain range was formerly known in European languages as Richthofen Range after Ferdinand von Richthofen, who was the Red Baron's explorer-geologist uncle.

The mountain range gives its name to Qinghai's Qilian County.

References

External links
 Winchester, Simon. (2008). The Man Who Loved China: the Fantastic Story of the Eccentric Scientist Who Unlocked the Mysteries of the Middle Kingdom. New York: Harper. 
 
 peakbagger.com
 Climatological Information (Reference) for Qilian Shan

Mountain ranges of China
Mountain ranges of Gansu
Sites along the Silk Road
Landforms of Qinghai
Highest points of Chinese provinces